The Puwersa ng Masa Coalition (Force of the Masses) was the Philippine opposition's political multi-party electoral alliance in the May 14, 2001, midterm Legislative elections. The coalition was created after the EDSA Revolution of 2001 that ousted Joseph Estrada from the presidency on January 20. The coalition was led by former First Lady Luisa Estrada who successfully ran for a Senate seat. The coalition featured candidates from the Laban ng Demokratikong Pilipino and the Pwersa ng Masang Pilipino parties, as well as independent candidates.

The senatorial slate

Election results
4 out of 13 candidates won the possible 13 seats in the Senate namely: (in order of votes received)
 Edgardo Angara
 Noli de Castro
 Loi Ejercito
 Panfilo Lacson

References

See also
People Power Coalition, Puwersa ng Masa's rival coalition
Laban ng Makabayang Masang Pilipino, the opposition's coalition during the 1998 Philippine national elections

Defunct political party alliances in the Philippines